Sidwell Friends School is a Quaker school located in Bethesda, Maryland and Washington, D.C., offering pre-kindergarten through high school classes. All Sidwell Friends students attend Quaker meeting for worship weekly, and middle school students begin every day with five minutes of silence.

The school's admissions process is merit-based. As documented on the school's website, it gives preference in admissions decisions to members of the Religious Society of Friends, but otherwise does not discriminate on the basis of religion.  Sidwell "accepts only 7 percent of its applicants."  The school accepts vouchers under the D.C. Opportunity Scholarship Program.

Described as "the Harvard of Washington’s private schools," the school has educated children of notable politicians, including those of several presidents. President Theodore Roosevelt's son Archibald, President Richard Nixon's daughters Tricia and Julie, President Bill Clinton's daughter Chelsea Clinton, President Barack Obama's daughters Sasha and Malia, the grandchildren of President Joe Biden when he was Vice President, and Vice President Al Gore's son, Albert Gore III, graduated from Sidwell Friends.

History 
Thomas Sidwell started a "Friends' Select School" in 1883 on I Street in downtown Washington, four blocks from the White House. It opened with just eleven students.

Beginning in 1911, Sidwell began buying property between Wisconsin Avenue and 37th St. Initially, the new property was used for athletic fields—and, with the central campus' downtown location—meant students had to shuttle between the two sites by streetcar. However, in 1923, Sidwell built a building for school dances and other social gatherings on what came to be known as the Wisconsin Avenue campus.

In 1925, the school added a kindergarten, making it the first K–12 school in Washington. In 1934, the name of the school was changed to "Sidwell and Friends School," and began its gradual re-location to the Wisconsin Avenue building. By 1938, the transition to the new building had been completed, and the I Street property was sold.

Previously all grade levels were in Washington, DC. In 1963 the elementary school moved to the former Longfellow School for Boys, purchased by Sidwell Friends.

Sidwell became racially integrated in 1964. Before 1964 it was a white-only school. In the decades following integration, problems faced by black students lead to the creation of two parent groups outside the school, which sought to alleviate covert prejudice.

Thomas B. Farquhar was removed from his position as the Head of School after the 2013–2014 school year. He became the Head of School after the retirement of former Head of School Bruce Stewart at the end of the 2008–2009 school year. Bryan K. Garman, the current Head of School, took office beginning with the 2014–2015 school year.

In 2018, Sidwell, along with 7 other DC Area Private schools, announced that they would be eliminating AP courses, citing the declining impact on one's college acceptance chances that AP courses were having, and a want to diversify their class offerings. This sparked the Department of Justice to launch an antitrust investigation into the schools, which concluded in 2021 after the DOJ stated that "in light of the burden on the Schools associated with the ongoing pandemic, the division will not bring an enforcement action against the Schools".

In April 2020, the school received $5.2 million in federally backed small business loans as part of the Paycheck Protection Program. The school received scrutiny over this loan, which meant to protect small and private businesses. Treasury Secretary Steven Mnuchin tweeted that the schools should return the money, but the school stated they were keeping it, despite having a $53 million endowment.

 the school plans to move elementary grades back to the District of Columbia, as it purchased the former Washington Home in 2017 for campus expansion purposes.

Academics 
In 2005, Sidwell's AP English Exam scores were the highest in the nation for all medium-sized schools (300–799 students in grades 10–12) offering the AP English exam. Sidwell does not offer an AP English course.

All students must acquire at least 20 credits before graduating. Students are required to take four years of English, three years of mathematics, three years of history, two years of one foreign language, two years of science, and two years of art. In addition to this, all freshmen must take a full year Ninth Grade Studies course that involves a service project. Tenth and eleventh graders must also take courses corresponding to their grade level.

Sidwell is a member school of School Year Abroad.

Student safety 
In 2016, the school revised its policy on sexual misconduct after reports that a teen had been raped by her ex-boyfriend on the school's campus. No charges were filed against the teen, and the school installed more security cameras to deter future assaults. Despite the measures, a year later another teenage female student reported being raped on the campus grounds by a fellow student. 

Former Sidwell psychologist and sex ed teacher James Huntington was the target of a 2013 lawsuit for his affair with the parent of a student he was counseling. The case exposed teachers that had made advances towards students.

In 2017, the school fired a middle school music teacher, Michael Henderson, who had been accused of having inappropriate contact with a 14-year old girl at a previous school. In 1996,The parents of Sara Lawson, a student at the Fountain Valley High School, filed a police report that detailed multiple incidences of "unwanted touching and kissing" between her and Henderson while she was 14. She later stated that Henderson once invited her over to his house and made her a drink that caused her to be incapacitated for the rest of the night. In a letter Sidwell's Head of School Bryan Garman sent to parents, he stated that "A former administrator ... was aware that Michael’s departure from his previous employer had been precipitated by his inappropriate conduct, but had no knowledge of the severity of the allegations as they now stand."

Athletics 
Sidwell's athletic teams are known as the Quakers; their colors are maroon and gray. The Quakers compete in the Mid-Atlantic Athletic Conference (MAC) for boys' sports (after previously competing in the Interstate Athletic Conference (IAC) until 1999) and the Independent School League (ISL) for girls' sports. Sidwell offers teams in volleyball, golf, boys and girls cross country, football, field hockey, girls and boys soccer, boys and girls basketball, boys and girls swimming and diving, wrestling, boys and girls tennis, baseball, boys and girls lacrosse, boys and girls track, ultimate frisbee, crew, movement performance and choreography, and softball.

Basketball
The womens' basketball is consistently a top program in the DMV area. The Quakers completed an undefeated season from 2021-2022 and were ranked the #1 best girls' basketball team in the nation by recruiting website MaxPreps as well as by ESPN. In the 2022-2023 season, the team won their second straight DCSAA state championship in a 68-49 win against St. Johns. Led by Coach Tamika Dudley and Duke commit Jadyn Donovan, the consensus #3 recruit in the class of 2023, the team was once again ranked as the top team in the nation by various recruiting websites and sports journalism pages after compiling a 28-3 record.

The mens' team is another top program in the DMV area, finishing the 2022-2023 season with a state championship, two conference championships (regular season and tournament) and 27-4 record. Led by head coach Eric Singletary, the program has produced many NBA players in the past years including Josh Hart and Saddiq Bey. The season included wins against national #1 Paul VI, and the Quakers were recognized by MaxPreps and SportsCenter Next as one of the top teams in the nation.

Boys' cross country
Sidwell's boys cross country team won four consecutive conference championships from 2006 to 2009. In 2015, they won the MAC Championships. Sidwell held this second streak for five years until they lost the 2021 MAC Championships.

Current profile 
 For the 2022-2023 school year, 1,142 students are enrolled.
 57% of the student body are people of color.
 21% of the student body receives some form of financial assistance.
 The school employs 273 full-time teachers and staff.
 84% of faculty hold advanced degrees.
 Tuition for the 2022–2023 school year ranges from $47,200 for grades PK-2, to $51,650 for Upper School.
 The school does not compute GPAs or assign rankings to its students, nor does it release score averages for the SAT and ACT. However, it does publish a list of institutions at which recently graduated students have matriculated.
 As of 2023, Sidwell Friends School is rated the 14th Best Private K-12 School in the US by Niche.

Campuses 

The Middle and Upper School campus is located at 3825 Wisconsin Avenue, N.W., Washington, D.C., 20016-2907
  Wisconsin Avenue campus in the North Cleveland Park section of Northwest Washington
 Earl G. Harrison Jr. Upper School Building
 Middle School building with Leadership in Energy and Environmental Design (LEED) Platinum Certification, designed by architect KieranTimberlake Associates and landscape design by Andropogon Associates. The wood-clad building was designed around a sustainable use of water and energy, exemplified by a constructed wetland in the center of the campus, with many species of plants, as well as turtles and fish, part of a wastewater recycling system designed by Biohabitats. On the interior, the building uses thermal chimneys and louvers that admit diffuse light to limit the need for artificial light and thermal control. Lastly, the building contains a centralized mechanical plant that uses less energy than normal, much of which is produced by photovoltaic banks on the roof. The materials used and the environmental technology are referenced architecturally and made accessible to students, either physically, or by explanatory signs, as an educational feature.
 Kogod Center for the Arts
 Richard Walter Goldman Memorial Library
 Zartman House (administration building)
 Sensner Building (Fox Den Cafe and school store)
 Wannan and Kenworthy Gymnasiums
 Three athletic fields, five tennis courts, and two tracks (one 2-lane indoor track indoor for bad weather and an outdoor 6-lane track for competitions).
 Parking facility with faculty, student, guest and alumni parking (2 floors, 200+ parking spaces), as well as offices for security, IT and maintenance

The Lower School campus can be found at 5100 Edgemoor Lane, Bethesda, Montgomery County, Maryland, 20814-2306
  Edgemoor Lane campus in Bethesda (formerly Longfellow School for Boys; opened for the 1963–64 school year)
 Manor House (classrooms, administration, and Clark Library)
 Groome Building (classrooms and multi-purpose room)
 Science, Art, and Music (SAM) Building
 The Bethesda Friends Meeting House
 Athletic fields, a gymnasium, and two playgrounds

Both campuses underwent major renovations throughout the 2005–2006 school year, and construction for the Wisconsin Avenue campus Athletic Center (which includes the Kenworthy Courts) was completed in 2011.

Sidwell Friends plans to move the Lower School to the site of the current site of The Washington Home and Community Hospices, which is adjacent to the Wisconsin Avenue campus. Until funding is secured, there is currently no timeline for when this move will take place.

Notable alumni 
Notable alumni of Sidwell Friends include:

Activism
 Robert F. Kennedy Jr. (transferred to Georgetown Preparatory School), American environmental attorney and activist
 Tracye McQuirter (1984), vegan activist
 Vanessa Wruble (1992), co-founder of 2017 Women's March
 John Flower, founder of China Folk House Retreat

Art and music
 Jeffrey Mumford (1973), composer
 Oteil Burbridge (1982), bassist for Dead & Company and the Allman Brothers Band
 Alyson Cambridge (born 1980), operatic soprano and classical music, jazz, and American popular song singer
 Sonya Clark (1985), artist
 Malinda Kathleen Reese, YouTube personality, actress and singer

Business
 Daniel Mudd (1976), former CEO of Fannie Mae
 Nick Friedman (2000), entrepreneur
 Omar Soliman (2000), author and entrepreneur
 Tom Bernthal,  American marketing CEO and former NBC News producer 

Crime
 William Zantzinger, convicted killer and subject of the Bob Dylan song, "The Lonesome Death of Hattie Carroll"

Education
Alida Anderson (1987), American University faculty and widely published special education researcher.
Hanna Holborn Gray (1947 or 1948), historian and Provost of Yale University and later the President of University of Chicago
 Philip S. Khoury (1967), Ford International Professor of History and Associate Provost, MIT
 George A. Akerlof, Nobel Prize winner for Economics and current faculty member at Georgetown University

Government and law
 Naomi Biden, lawyer and granddaughter of U.S. President Joe Biden
 David W. Dennis (1929), Indiana congressman
 John Deutch (1956), Central Intelligence Agency Director, MIT professor
 Roger W. Ferguson, Jr. (1969), Federal Reserve Board Former vice-chairman
 Doug Gansler (1981), State's Attorney for Montgomery County, Maryland (1999—2007), Attorney General of the State of Maryland, (2007–2015)
 William Henry Harrison III (1914 or 1915), Republican Representative from Wyoming and great-great-grandson of President William Henry Harrison
 Nancy Reagan, former First Lady (attended the elementary school 1925–1928)
 Oleg Alexandrovich Troyanovsky, Soviet ambassador to the United Nations
 Edward Tylor Miller (1912 or 1913), Maryland congressman
 Katherine Tai, US Trade Representative 

Journalism
Anne Applebaum (1982), journalist and author
 John Dickerson (1987), journalist, political commentator, and writer.
 Dan Froomkin (1981), journalist and Huffington Post columnist
Anand Giridharadas (1999), journalist and author of Winners Take All: The Elite Charade of Changing the World
 Charles Gibson (1961), ABC World News Tonight anchor, host of ABC's Good Morning America
 James K Glassman (1965), editorialist, syndicated columnist, and author
 Tony Horwitz (1976), journalist and author
 Clara Jeffery (1985), editor of Mother Jones magazine
 
Literature and poetry
 Elizabeth Alexander (1980), poet
 Ann Brashares (1985), author of The Sisterhood of the Traveling Pants series of books
 Margaret Edson (1979), Pulitzer Prize–winning author of Wit
 John Katzenbach (1968), author
 Campbell McGrath (1980), poet and winner of the MacArthur Foundation "Genius Award"
 Susan Shreve (1957), professor, author and novelist
 Lorin Stein, editor in chief of The Paris Review
 Andrew Szanton (1981), author
 Philip Terzian (1961–66) Author and journalist, Literary Editor of The Weekly Standard  
 John Dos Passos, (attended 1902–1903)
 Gore Vidal

Movies and television
 Jon Bernthal (1995), actor
 Ezra Edelman (1992), Emmy Award-winning documentary producer and director
 Ana Gasteyer (1985), actress
 Davis Guggenheim (1982), film director, An Inconvenient Truth among others
 Thomas Kail (1995), director
 Nana Meriwether (2003), Miss USA 2012
 Robert Newmyer (1974), film producer
 Eliza Orlins, contestant on Survivor: Vanuatu, Survivor: Micronesia, and The Amazing Race 31
 Scott Sanders (1986), director of Black Dynamite
 Baratunde Thurston (1995), comedian
 Alexandra Tydings (1989), actress
 Robin Weigert (1987), actress

Presidential children
 Chelsea Clinton (1997), daughter of President Bill Clinton and former Secretary of State Hillary Clinton
 Tricia Nixon Cox (1964) daughter of President Richard Nixon
 Julie Nixon Eisenhower (1966) daughter of President Richard Nixon
 Malia Obama (2016), daughter of President Barack Obama
 Sasha Obama (2019), daughter of President Barack Obama
 Archibald Roosevelt (1912?), son of Theodore Roosevelt

Royalty
 Setsuko, Princess Chichibu, member of the Japanese Imperial Family (attended 1925–1928)

Science and technology
 Walter Gilbert (1949), Nobel Prize winner in Chemistry
 Charles Lindbergh (attended 1913–1915)
 Bill Nye (1973), science communicator

Sports
 Saddiq Bey (2018), NBA player for the Atlanta Hawks.
 Paul Goldstein (1994), professional tennis player, 4-time NCAA Champion and All-American at Stanford, 2-time USTA 18 & Under national champion.
 Josh Hart (2013), basketball player, first-round selection of 2017 NBA draft
 Kara Lawson (1999, left in 1996) WNBA player and star at the University of Tennessee, 5th pick of the 2003 WNBA Draft.
 Jair Lynch (1989), gymnast, 1996 Olympic Silver Medalist in parallel bars
 Roger Mason (1999, left in 1996) NBA player for the San Antonio Spurs and star at the University of Virginia, 31st pick of the 2002 NBA Draft.
 Natalie Randolph (1999), former football coach Coolidge High School in Washington, D.C.
 Ed Tapscott (1971), former American University basketball coach and Washington Wizards interim head coach

Sister schools 
 High School affiliated to Fudan University
 The Second High School Attached to Beijing Normal University
Ramallah Friends Schools
Moses Brown School

References

External links 

 Sidwell Friends School
 Sidwell Friends School first K-12 to receive LEED Platinum
 Country Addition to Friends School – advertisement for school in 1910

Quaker schools in Maryland
Private high schools in Washington, D.C.
Preparatory schools in Maryland
Preparatory schools in Washington, D.C.
Educational institutions established in 1883
Georgian architecture in Washington, D.C.
Schools in Bethesda, Maryland
Private K-12 schools in Washington, D.C.
Private middle schools in Washington, D.C.
Private elementary schools in Montgomery County, Maryland
1963 establishments in Maryland
1883 establishments in Washington, D.C.
North Cleveland Park